The Naval Gold Medal was awarded between 1793 and 1815 to senior officers of the Royal Navy for specified actions.

Two different sizes were struck. 22 large medals were awarded to flag officers (admirals), commodores and captains of the fleet. 117 smaller medals were awarded to captains. As a separate medal was awarded for each action, it was possible for a recipient to receive and wear more than one.

Awards of the gold medal were discontinued after 1815, as would-be recipients became eligible for the Order of the Bath on its enlargement to three classes.

Appearance
Medals were mounted in a gold frame, glazed on both sides.
 Obverse: Britannia holding a spear and standing on the prow of an ancient galley, being crowned with a laurel wreath by a figure of Victory. Behind is an oval shield charged with the Union Flag.
 Reverse: Engraved with the rank and name of the recipient, and the event and date for which the medal was awarded. The large medal has a surround of a wreath of oak and laurel.
In 1847, this ribbon was used for the Naval General Service Medal.
 Suspension: Large medals had a ring suspension for wear around the neck. Small medals were worn on the left chest by way of a straight bar suspender, normally from a buttonhole. Six of the large medals awarded for the Glorious First of June were presented suspended from a gold chain.

Awards
Following the Battle of the Glorious First of June 1794, the Naval Gold Medal was instituted to reward those admirals and captains who had been conspicuous for courage in that action, as well as those who might distinguish themselves on future occasions.

In spite of representations made by Lord Nelson, no medal was authorised for the Battle of Copenhagen, due to concerns that it may offend the Danes.

Recipients surviving until 1847 were entitled to apply for the Naval General Service Medal with the appropriate clasps.

Gold Medals were issued by the Admiralty for the following actions. Only selected captains received a medal for the Glorious First of June, otherwise all captains or acting captains were recipients.

Some notable recipients
Only three Naval officers earned three gold medals:
 Sir Edward Berry. Received three small gold medals, for the battles of the Nile, Trafalgar and San Domingo.
 Lord Collingwood. Received small gold medals for the battles of the Glorious First of June and St Vincent, and a large gold medal for Trafalgar.
 Viscount Nelson. Awarded three large medals, for the battles of St. Vincent, the Nile and posthumously for Trafalgar.
Other selected awards are listed below:

Large Gold Medal
 Viscount Duncan. Commanded British fleet at Camperdown
 Alexander Hood. Vice Admiral at the Glorious First of June
 Earl Howe. Commanded British fleet at the Glorious First of June
 John Jervis, Earl of St Vincent. Commanded British fleet at St Vincent 
Small Gold Medal
 Philip Broke.
 Sir James Gambier. Commanded  on the Glorious First of June 
 Sir Edward Hamilton.
 Sir Charles Knowles. Commanded  at St Vincent 
 William Mounsey. As captain of HMS Bonne Citoyenne, he captured the French frigate Furieuse
 George Murray. Commanded  at St Vincent
 Thomas Pringle. Commanded  on the Glorious First of June
 Sir Michael Seymour.
 Robert Stopford. Commanded  at San Domingo
 Charles Tyler. Commanded  at  Trafalgar

References

Bibliography
 Dorling, H. Taprell, Ribbons and Medals, (1956), A. H. Baldwin & Son
 Joslin, Edward C, Observer Book of British Awards and Medals, (1973), Frederick Warne & Co 
 Joslin, Litherland and Simpkin (eds), British Battles and Medals, (1988), Spink 
 
 Mussell, J (ed), Medals Yearbook 2016, (2015), Token Publishing. 
  Contains (pp. 295–302) a complete list of medals awarded between 1793–1847.
 Oxford Dictionary of National Biography (2004) Oxford University Press.  Contains biographies of most recipients of the Naval Gold Medal.
 

British campaign medals
Decorations of the Royal Navy